Parkland County is a municipal district in central Alberta, Canada.

History 
2021 wildfire
In May 2021, a wildfire, originating in Tomahawk, was reported. Evacuation orders, spanning from Highway 22 to the west, Township Road 524 to the north, Range Road 63 to the east, and Township Road 510 to the south, were issued on May 5.

Geography

Communities and localities 
The following urban municipalities are surrounded by Parkland County.
Cities
Spruce Grove
Towns
Stony Plain
Villages
Spring Lake
Summer villages
Betula Beach
Kapasiwin
Lakeview
Point Alison
Seba Beach

The following hamlets are located within Parkland County.
Hamlets
Carvel
Duffield
Entwistle
Fallis
Gainford
Keephills
Tomahawk
Wabamun

The following localities are located within Parkland County.
Localities

Acheson
Alpine Acres
Amisk Acres
Annaliesa Estates
Anne Dale Acres
Arrowhead Estates
Ascot Beach
Ashwood Meadows
Aspen Estates
Aspen Hills
Avondale Acres
Avondale Estates
Banksiana Ranch
Beach Corner
Beach Corner Heights
Beau Rand Estates
Beaver Brook Park
Beaverbrook
Bell Acres
Bergman Estates
Birch Estates
Birch Hill Park (designated place)
Birch Hills
Birch Street Estates
Bonnie Acres
Bowen Lake Estates
Bridgewater Properties
Brightbank
Brightbank Estates
Broken Wheel Ranches
Brookside Estates
Burtonsville
Cameron Heights
Cameron Lake Estates
Canterbury Estates
Carvel Corner
Cedar Heights
Central Heights
Chateau Heights
Chelsea Estates
Cherlyn Heights
Cheryl Heights
Chickadoo Estates
Chickakoo Estates
Clear Lake Estates
Clearwater Estates (designated place)
Cole Anne Heights
Cottage Lake Heights
Country Lane Estates
Crystal Meadows (designated place)
Dartmoor Meadow
Dawn Valley (designated place)
Deer Lake Estates
Deer Park
Deer Park No. 1 Subdivision
Deer Park No. 2 Subdivision
Deer Park No. 3 Subdivision
Delta Estates
Devon Ridge Estates
Devonshire Grove
Devonshire Meadows (designated place)
Double You Ranch
Douglas Meadows
Duffield Downs
East Eighty Estates
Eden Park Estates

Edgemont Ridge
Edgewood Acres
Edinburgh Park
Erin Estates (designated place)
Eureka Beach
Exelsior Park
Falcon Hills
Fernwood Estates
Fleming Park (designated place)
Forest Heights
Freeman
Garden Grove Estates (designated place)
Gardner's Cove
Genesse Park
Glenwood Estates
Glory Hills Estates
Golden Acres
Golden Spike
Graminia
Grand River Valley
Grandmuir Estates (designated place)
Green Acre Estates (designated place)
Greenfield Acres
Grove Acres
Hacienda Estates
Happy Acres
Harder Acres
Harris Acres
Heatherlea
Helenslea Estates
Hennic Acres
Highland Acres
Highvale
Hillside Estates
Hilltop Acres
Hillview Estates
Holborn
Horen
Horizon West
Hubbles Lake (designated place) or Hubble Lake Subdivision
Huntington Heights
Hycrest Place
J. C.'s Ranch
Jay Haven
Jesperview Heights
Johnny's Estates
Johnny's Lake Estates
Kathmarcan Estates
Kilini Ridge
Kolba Estates
Kolga Estates
Lake Country Estates
Lake Crest
Lake Isle Estates
Lakeside Park
Lamorr Landing Estates
Landmark Estates
Langford Park
Lincolnshire Downs
Linden Acres
Magnolia
Magnolia Bridge
Mallard Park
Manly
Manly Corner
Manuan Lake

Marine Drive Estates
Marra Kesh Estates
Maude West
Mayatan Lake Estates
Mayfair Heights
Meadow Crest
Meadow Grove Estates
Meadow Ridge
Meadow Run
Meadowview Park
Meridian Estates
Meso West (designated place) or Messo West
Mewassin
Michael Park
Michel Park
Millham Gardens
Moon Lake
Neutral Valley
Norris Acres
North Side Acres
Northleigh
Northridge Meadows
Oakwood Estates
Old Entwistle
Osborne Acres (designated place)
Panorama Heights (designated place)
Paramac Cove
Paramac Point
Park Ridge Heights
Parkland Heights
Parkland Village
Parkland Village Trailer Ct. North
Parkland Village Trailer Ct. South
Parklane Acres
Parkview Estates
Parmac Cove
Parmac Point
Partridge Heights
Partridge Place
Patricia Hills
Peterburn Estates (designated place) or Peter Burn Estate
Pine Valley Acres Subdivision
Pinewood Subdivision
Poplar Grove
Prestige Heights
Princess Estates
Richie's Point
Ridgewood Estates
Riverview Acres
Rizzie's Point
Rolling Heights (designated place)
Rolling Hills
Rolling Meadows (designated place)
Rolling View Estates
Rosewood Beach
Roslaire Estates
Royal Park
Sandy Heights
Sandy Ridge
Scenic View Estates
Shady Acres
Shannon Meadows
Sherwin
Silver Bell Estates
Silver Bell Heights

Silver Diamond Estates
Silver Sands Estates
Singer Acres
Singing Hill Estates
Skyline Gardens
Smithfield
Sorensens Park
South Parkdale
South Seba Beach
South Woodland Acres
Spanish Oaks
Spring Hills
Spruce Bluff
Spruce Ridge
Spruce Valley Estates
Sprucehill Park
Star Lake
Star Lake Estates
Stony Brook Gardens
Stonybrook Gardens
Summer View Heights
Sundance Power Plant (designated place) or Sundance
Sundance Meadows
Sundown Estates
Sunnyside Park
Sunset View Acres (designated place)
Surrey Lane Acreages
Swiss Valley
Terralta Estates
Tower Acres
Trafalgar Heights
Tranquility Hills
Twin Ravines
Valaspen Place
Viewpoint Estates
Warnock Acres
Weekend Estates
Wendel Heights
Wendel Place
Wendel Place Park
West Country Estates
West Eighty Estates
West Gentry Estates
West Hill Acres
West Lake Estates
West Parkdale
West Thirty-Five Estates
Westbrooke Crescents (designated place) or Westbrook Crescent
Westering Heights
Westland Park
Westward Acres
Whispering Pines
Whitewood Sands
Wild Rose Park
Willow Park
Willow Ridge
Willow Ridge Estates
Winfield Heights
Woodbend Crescent (designated place) or Woodbend Crescents
Woodbend Place
Woodland Acres
Woodland Park (designated place)
Woodridge
Woodridge Estates
Yellowhead Estates

Other places
Westlake Estates (designated place)

Demographics 

In the 2016 Census of Population conducted by Statistics Canada, Parkland County had a population of 32,097 living in 11,615 of its 12,910 total private dwellings, a  change from its 2011 population of 30,568.

Economy 
Parkland County's economic development hub is the Acheson Industrial Area. Its  of land is home to over 200 businesses.

Attractions 
 Wagner Natural Area
 Clifford E. Lee Nature Sanctuary
 University of Alberta Botanic Garden
 Golf courses: Trestle Creek Golf Resort www.trestlecreek.ca,  Cougar Creek Golf Resort, Deer Meadows Golf Course, Devon Valley Golf Course, Edmonton Springs Golf, resort, Grouse Nest Golf Course, Indian Lakes Golf Course, Les Furbur designed Ironhead Golf & Country Club on the Paul First Nation www.ironheadgolfcourse.ca, The Links Spruce Grove, Pineridge Golf Course, The Ranch Golf & Country Club, Stony Plain Golf Course, Whitewood Links Golf & RV Park
 Lakes: Jackfish Lake, Hasse Lake
 Regional Parks and Campgrounds: Chickakoo Lake Park, KoKoMoKo, Ascot Beach Park, Rich's Point Park, Muir Lake Park, Constable Chelsey Robinson Day Use Park
 Wabamun Provincial Park
 Pembina River Provincial Park

See also 
List of communities in Alberta
List of municipal districts in Alberta

References

External links 

 
Edmonton Metropolitan Region
Municipal districts in Alberta